Đorđe Vukobrat (born 5 May 1984) is a Serbian football defender who plays with BGH City in the Canadian Soccer League.

Career
Vukobrat played in the Serbian League Vojvodina for a season with FK Inđija. The following season he played in the First League of Serbia and Montenegro with FK Srem, and had a loan spell with FK Polet Novi Karlovci. In 2009, he ultimately signed a permanent deal with FK Big Bull Bačinci. He played with FK Donji Srem in 2011, and assisted in securing a promotion to the Serbian SuperLiga. In 2013, he played abroad in the Oman Professional League with Al-Nasr SC.

In 2015, he returned to his former club FK Donji Srem, and later played with FK Radnički Sremska Mitrovica. He had a second spell abroad in the Dhivehi Premier League with United Victory. In 2019, he played in the Canadian Soccer League with Hamilton City SC. After the merger between Hamilton with Brantford Galaxy he played with BGH City FC for the 2021 season.

References

External links
 
 Đorđe Vukobrat stats at utakmica.rs 
 

1984 births
Living people
Footballers from Novi Sad
Association football defenders
Serbian footballers
FK Inđija players
FK Srem players
FK Radnički Šid players
FK Donji Srem players
Al-Nasr SC (Salalah) players
Hamilton City SC players
United Victory players
Serbian First League players
Serbian SuperLiga players
Serbian expatriate footballers
Serbian expatriate sportspeople in Oman
Expatriate footballers in Oman
Oman Professional League players
Canadian Soccer League (1998–present) players
Serbian League players